Hunsterson is a civil parish in Cheshire East, England. It contains seven buildings that are recorded in the National Heritage List for England as designated listed buildings, all of which are at Grade II.  This grade is the lowest of the three gradings given to listed buildings and is applied to "buildings of national importance and special interest". The parish is almost entirely rural. The listed buildings consist of houses, farmhouses, cottages, a stable with paddock walls, and a church.

See also

Listed buildings in Austerson
Listed buildings in Buerton
Listed buildings in Doddington
Listed buildings in Hankelow
Listed buildings in Hatherton
Listed buildings in Walgherton
Listed buildings in Woore

References
Citations

Sources

 

Listed buildings in the Borough of Cheshire East
Lists of listed buildings in Cheshire